Ziridava rufinigra is a moth in the family Geometridae first described by Charles Swinhoe in 1895. It is found on Borneo and in India, New Guinea and the Australian state of Queensland.

The wingspan is about 20 mm. Adults are yellow with a broad irregular brown band along the costa of each forewing, and a broad brown mark at the tornus of each hindwing.

Subspecies
Ziridava rufinigra rufinigra (India, Borneo)
Ziridava rufinigra brevicellula Prout, 1916 (New Guinea)
Ziridava rufinigra cedreleti Prout, 1958 (Queensland)

References

Moths described in 1895
Eupitheciini